Bagrianwala is a town and union council of Gujrat District, in the Punjab province of Pakistan. It is part of Kharian Tehsil and is located at 32°33'0N 73°52'0E  with an altitude of 217 metres (715 feet).

References

Union councils of Gujrat District
Populated places in Gujrat District
Towns in Gujrat District